Nothomiza flavicosta is a moth of the  family Geometridae. It is found in Taiwan.

References

Moths described in 1914
Ourapterygini
Moths of Taiwan